The Chosen Few were an Australian rock band active between 1985 and 1992.  Signed to Mushroom Records and managed by Stuart Coupe, the Chosen Few released four singles and a lone album Friends, Foes and Firewood (1990).  Despite constant national touring (including opening for major touring acts like Jerry Harrison, Cheap Trick and Billy Joel on their respective Australian tours) and receiving support from the country's most influential radio stations, chart success eluded the Chosen Few. A cover version of the band's song "Rise", with some lyrical alterations, became a hit for popular Australian singer Daryl Braithwaite.

Biography
The Chosen Few was formed in 1985 in Sydney by Abe Elshaikh (lead guitar, vocals) with Danny McCarthy (guitar, vocals), Paul Read (bass) and Rex Mansfield (drums). After numerous months rehearsing, writing and cutting demos, the band was taken up by rock writer and manager Stuart Coupe (who at the time was enjoying commercial success as manager for Paul Kelly) and signed to Mushroom Records in 1988.

The band's debut single "Get It Right" was released in November 1988 and was met with enthusiasm in the Australian rock music media. The band's follow-up single, "Rise", was released in April 1989 and was critically praised. "Love" was released in November 1989.

The band's debut album Friends, Foes and Firewood was released in 1990 and peaked at number 128 on the Australian album charts in July 1990.

In 1994, the band formerly known as The Chosen Few (without Elshaikh) re-emerged as The Dreamseed with addition of guitarist Steve Barnes and Darren Bulmer, and relocated to Germany.
Paul Read is currently a member of Stormcellar.

Band members
 Danny McCarthy (guitar, vocals)
 Abe Elshaikh (lead guitar, vocals)
 Paul Read (bass)
 Rex Mansfield (drums)

Discography

Studio albums

Singles

References

External links
 45cat page
 discogs page
 Rate Your Music Page

Australian rock music groups
Musical groups established in 1985
Musical groups from Sydney
1985 establishments in Australia